Royal University may mean:
 Pontifical and Royal University of Santo Tomas, Philippines
 Royal University of Bhutan
 Royal University of Ireland
 Sapienza University of Rome, called the Reale Università degli studi di Roma between 1870 and 1935, when it was transferred from papal governance to the Kingdom of Italy